"Das Glühwürmchen", known in English as "The Glow-Worm", is a song from Paul Lincke's 1902 operetta Lysistrata, with German lyrics by Heinz Bolten-Backers. In the operetta, it is performed as a trio with three female solo voices singing alternately and the women's chorus joining in the refrain. Rhythmically, it is in the form of a gavotte. The song, with its familiar chorus, was translated into English and became an American popular song.

It was originally translated into English by Lilla Cayley Robinson, in the early 20th century, and was used in the 1907 Broadway musical The Girl Behind the Counter.

American lyricist Johnny Mercer later expanded and greatly revised Robinson's lyrics, for the 1952 recording by The Mills Brothers.
His version was a hit for the Mills Brothers, and it has been performed by several others.

The tune is also quite popular as an orchestral instrumental.

Lyrics
Robinson's English-translation lyrics (circa 1905):

Johnny Mercer kept the original chorus basically intact and added three new "verses" to that same tune but did not use music from the original song's verses at all.

Renditions and other appearances in popular culture
 Probably the best-known recording of the song was done by The Mills Brothers with the Hal McIntyre Orchestra in 1952. Their version spent 21 weeks on the charts, including 3 weeks at #2.
 Ballerina Anna Pavlova performed an orchestrated version of "The Glow-Worm".
 The Victor Company's Nathaniel Shilkret arranged and recorded an instrumental version titled The Glow-Worm--Idyl with the Victor Salon Orchestra, released as Victor 19758 in 1925. 
 Spike Jones released a version of the song in 1946, replete with his typical comic sound effects.
 Allan Sherman parodied the song as "Grow, Mrs. Goldfarb."
 The song was heard multiple times in the season 2 I Love Lucy episode "The Saxophone" (1952), being played by Lucy Ricardo (Lucille Ball) on saxophone.
 Jean-Jacques Perrey used the song to make "La Gavotte Des Vers Luisants" (1960) for his album, Mister Ondioline. 
 In the 1960s, the soft drink Dr Pepper used the tune of the song's chorus in their "It's Dr Pepper Time!" ads.
 In an early sketch by The Muppets, Kermit the Frog (performed by Jim Henson) sits on a wall and hums "Glow-Worm". One by one, small worms crawl up to Kermit, and he eats them -- but the third worm turns out to be the long nose of a giant monster, who eats Kermit. This sketch was performed on The Ed Sullivan Show (November 27, 1966), in a 1971 episode of The Dick Cavett Show, and ultimately on The Muppet Show itself.
 The German keyboard player Klaus Wunderlich recorded an electronic version in 1974 using a Moog modular synthesizer to imitate the sound of glow-worms, frogs, mosquitos and other animals.
 Mel Tormé recorded a version with alternate lyrics for his 1992 Christmas album, Christmas Songs.
 An orchestral arrangement of the song is used in McCain Foods's "Good Unlimited" ads, which first aired in November 2009.
 In Season 8 of Ninjago, the character Cole cannot remember the whole song, and in frustration sings part of the chorus repeatedly

References

External links
 
 "The Glow-Worm" lyrics, Robinson and Mercer versions

Songs with music by Paul Lincke
Songs with lyrics by Johnny Mercer
Spike Jones songs
Songs about insects
1902 songs
1952 singles
Compositions in E-flat major